Phyllis Lindrea Covell ( Howkins. 22 May 1895 – 28 October 1982) was a female tennis player from Great Britain.

She is best remembered for her silver medal at the Paris Olympics of 1924 in the women's doubles event partnering with Kitty McKane. In 1923 she won the women's doubles title at the U.S. National Championships with McKane defeating the American pairing of Hazel Hotchkiss Wightman and Eleanor Goss in three sets. She was also a runner-up in the mixed doubles event at Wimbledon in 1921, partnering Max Woosnam. In 1924 she was part of the British Wightman Cup team who defeated the United States 6–1 at Wimbledon. Covell won both her singles matches against Helen Wills and Molla Mallory.

Personal life
Phyllis Howkins married Beverley Carthew Covell on 23 September 1921 in Bombay.

Grand Slam finals

Doubles: 4 (1 titles, 3 runners-up)

Mixed doubles: 2 (0 titles, 2 runners-up)

References

External links
 
 
 
 

1895 births
1982 deaths
British female tennis players
Olympic silver medallists for Great Britain
Olympic tennis players of Great Britain
Tennis players at the 1924 Summer Olympics
Olympic medalists in tennis
Grand Slam (tennis) champions in women's doubles
Medalists at the 1924 Summer Olympics
Tennis people from Greater London
English female tennis players
United States National champions (tennis)